Barabasti or BarahBasti initially had a group of 12 villages but later it exceeds and now they are more than 12 lying in Bulandshahr district in the Indian state of Uttar Pradesh. These villages are located adjacent to each other within an area of seven square miles, and noted for a high population of Pathans, in addition to other Muslims and Hindus.

Villages 

The name "Barabasti" simply mean twelve village's of Pathan settlement. The twelve villages, now under the districts of Bulandshahr, Ghaziabad and Amroha. Name of Bara basti village's are - Basi, Giroura, khanpur, Bugrasi, Jalalpur, Chandiyana, Gesupur, Barwala, Amarpur, Sherpur, Bahadurgarh, Hasanpur, Mohammadpur

History 
Shaikh Isa Afghan the head of his tribe Daudzai afghan was a horse trader who had six sons. The eldest son Shaikh Ruknu-d-din afghan served as mansabdar and was titled as Sher khan afghan by emperor jahangir who lost his arm in battle against umr singh the rana of udaipur and increase his grade of Mansabdari to 3500.The emperor Jahangir also conferred him jagir of peshawar to Sher khan aghan. The pargana of Gujarat sarkar was also given to him but after his death the emperor bestowed some portion of his jagir and rank to his brother and children . His son shaikh kamaluddin daudzai also served as mansabdar under the emperor Jahangir but later on shaikh Kamaluddin daudzai and khan jahan lodhi revolt against the mughals Shaikh Ruknu-d-din afghan settled the first village of bara basti on the shore of ganga Basi Bangar but after the death of Shaikh Ruknu-d-din afghan some portion of his rank and jagir was given to younger brother Shaikh Allu afghan who moved to another village and named it after his name Khanpur Shaikh Allu afghan also served as mansabdar & fought many battles under the service of Mughal Emperor shahjahan but the battle that came in the light of history is against Raja Jagat Singh pathania of Taragarh, Himachal Pradesh. He rebelled against mughal emperor Shahjahan in which Raja jagat singh fortified the forts of Nurpur, Mau, taragarh of Himachal Pradesh and during this battle Shaikh allu Afghan body was perished and only his head was came back to khanpur fort.Shaikh Allu Afghan built the big fort at erstwhile khanpur estate in back those days which had several majestic gates, a court, baradari , Mosque and all the structure is builded with big blocks and lakhauri bricks (Lahori) mostly of mud.The fort had a very wide with thick walls and expand in most khanpur and during his time the khanpur estate reached the pinnacle.

The Khanpur estate was the main headquarter of bara basti villages.

During the mughal era there were only few taluqdar estates at bulandshahar district that were khanpur Chhattari , kuchesar, pahasu ,shikarpur.The Khanpur family had inherited feud with jat kuchesar family and fought many battles with them for landholding /parghanas.

Historical event – Nawab mustufa khan (pen name -shefta) of jehangirabad who is contemporary of mirza ghalib Urdu poet & had closed ties with the Emperor Bahadur Shah Zafar was caught and expelled out from Jejhangirabad fort by Thakur bheem singh of village guroli then nawab shefta went to khanpur family and asked for the help because he had family relationship with khanpur family, then Haji Munir khan the only son of Azim khan went on elephant with many irregular cavalry troops which are mostly recruited from pathans of barabasti village's who are very valiant they had battle with thakur bhim singh & exchanged many shots with him and last he lost the battle then Haji Munir khan put him behind his elephant to khanpur fort and leave him on note not to trouble Nawab again.Then Nawab Mustufa khan shefta was re established at Jejhangirabad fort. The Khanpur estate family also played a prominent role during the first war independence 1857 but initially in the beginning when it broke out and there is less force at meerut and Brand sapte wrote letters to taluqdars of bulandshahr district to seek help by furnishing him with men & horse's and they all responded them immediately to his call but later on when Nawab walidad khan malagarh came to bulandshahar with sanad of doab from emperor Bahadur shah zafar then they started the revolt.There were three person from khanpur estate family who fought against the British empire duriIndependence 1857.

1-Azim Khan alias Azam khan – He actively participated in the battle of uprising under the overall command of Nawab walidad khan of Malagarh having been deputed as his deputy at khurja. He was arrested while crossing the ganga to move into Rohilkhand and subsequently hanged order of british military coommission. 2-Haji Munir khan alias Munir khan the only son of Azim khan and was the main commanders of the revolutionary of the bulandshahar district. In the famous second battle gulothi which is fought on 29 july 1857 in which britishers want took control over the whole bulandshahar district but to stop them nawab of malagarh deputed his main commander at gulothi Haji munir khan & ismail khan who established a picket just before gulothi on the canal to stop the colonial force to enter the bulandshahar district & fortified the bridge but there was surprised attack on them in which many revolutionaries were shaheed but these two managed to escape but haji munir khan & ismail khan got severe sword cuts on their face & due to this news of attack there was panic in the fort of malagarh and when they try to look for attack on nawab malagarh then nawab flew to khanpur fort & seek shelter and haji munir khan fought until his last breath. 3-Abdul Latif khan the nephew of Azim khan.He fought in different manner never came on battle field but gave shelter revolutionaries of bulandshahar including Nawul gurjar, Raheem ali khan & pathan of bara basti village when they were actively engaged in fighting the British. Refused to give land revenue to empire & write letter to the king to bring elephants & horses to the court but he was caught tried by British military commission and send to penal colony of Andaman island or kala pani.Later on the Estate was subsequently confiscated by the British Empire & was given to given to Sardar Bahadur syed meer khan the nephew of Jan fishan khan (Nawab Sardhana) as this family helped the empire during the war of 1857 & some portion was auctioned afterwards which was purchased by the loyal Zamindars of the district.

After the confiscation of the khanpur estate the family was expelled out thereafter they reached again to village basi bangar the village which was first established by Shaikh Ruknu-d-din afghan on the shores of Ganga river of Bara basti.

Transport 

Barahbasti is about 100 km from Delhi. Barabasti can be reached by road in a three-hour drive from Delhi. Time can be saved by taking the expressway from Delhi to Noida, then the Dankaur station road to Bulandshahr. Then from Bulandshahr to Siyana which is just 8 km from Barabasti.

Economy 

The basic economy of this area is based on agriculture. Barahbasti has many mango orchards, many varieties of mangoes are grown here like Dusseri, Bombayi, Chausa, Langda, Gulab-Jamun, Ratol and Fajri. You can find More than 100s varieties of mangoes in Barahbasti which are limited for their personal taste. The area supplies a large number of mangoes to the country, and has been declared fruit belt by the government of Uttar Pradesh. Hundreds of trucks loaded with mangoes go to various places including Azadpur Mandi (fruit market) in Delhi, and some of best mangoes are exported to Gulf and European markets.

Demographics 

Barabasti has a mix of Muslims and Hindus. However, it is noted for its relatively large Pathan population.

Notable people 

Arif Mohammad Khan, from Barwala. Governor of Kerala, former Civil Aviation Minister in the Indian Central Government, a two-time Member of Parliament (MP) and a three-time MLA. Governor of Kerala.

References 

Villages in Bulandshahr district